Kurokawa Station is a name for multiple stations in Japan.

Kurokawa Station (Hyogo) - In Hyogo Prefecture
Kurokawa Station (Kagawa) - In Kagawa Prefecture
Kurokawa Station (Kanagawa) - In Kanagawa Prefecture
Kurokawa Station (Nagoya) - In Nagoya, Aichi Prefecture